Albert, originally Martinsburg, is a ghost town  southeast of Fredericksburg and  west of the Blanco County line in southeastern Gillespie County, Texas, United States. The town was a stop on the Fredericksburg-Blanco stage route and in 1967 became a stop on the President's Ranch Trail.

In late October 2007, the town was put up for sale on the auction website eBay.

Early history
On December 15, 1847, a petition was submitted to create Gillespie County. In 1848, the legislature formed Gillespie County from Bexar and Travis counties. While the signers were overwhelmingly German immigrants, names also on the petition were Castillo, Pena, Munos,  and a handful of non-German Anglo names.

The first white settlers were George Cauley, Ben White, Sr., and a man named Jacobs. Around 1877, blacksmith Fritz Wilke, George Maenius, and John Petri moved from Fredericksburg seeking pasture for their cattle. Wilke bought land from a man named Elmeier, who was robbed and murdered years later.

The Martinsburg post office operated from 1877 to 1886. In 1892, Martinsburg got a new post office and a new name, after Albert Luckenbach sold his store in Luckenbach, and arrived to register a new post office in town, under the name Albert.

A school was established in 1891, and in 1897 postmaster Otto Schumann opened the town's first store. In 1900 a new school building was erected; 36th President of the United States Lyndon Baines Johnson was briefly enrolled there as a boy. A local Lutheran mission, the Lutheran Church of Stonewall, was established in 1902 which Johnson attended.

Albert, originally known as Martinsburg, was founded in the late 1870s by settlers from Fredericksburg, TX. The town was renamed May 24, 1892 when Wilhelmina Sophie “Minnie” Luckenbach opened a post office that she named for her husband, Carl Albert Luckenbach.

Population decline
Albert had 50 residents in 1925, only 4 in 1964, and 25 in 1972. By 1985 the store had been torn down, the school converted into a community club, and the dance hall a storage locker, though Albert still had 25 residents and two businesses. The population would stay at 25 through 2000, but by 2007, the town had been all but abandoned.

Since 2004
In 2004, Bobby Cave, at the time an insurance broker, bought Albert—more specifically, property on Ranch Road 1623 between Stonewall and Blanco— for $216,000.  Cave then built a tavern (in a style area locals call an icehouse)  on the site of the town's former general store; after investing nearly half a million dollars, in 2007 he put it up for sale on eBay with a reserve price of $2.5 million.  In 2009 the town was carved up and again for sale, this time with an asking price of $883,000.
 of the town was purchased by the Easley family (Point Evans, LLC) from Austin, Texas, and Brandon Easley, was nominated by the family to be the town manager. He has made several improvements to the ice house and surrounding property, and currently the dance hall is under renovation.

See also
Williams Creek School, Gillespie County, Texas

References

External links
Town website
Handbook of Texas Online article
Fox News

Former populated places in Gillespie County, Texas
EBay listings
Ghost towns in Central Texas
Populated places established in 1877
1877 establishments in Texas